Gracefield may refer to:

Places

Gracefield, Quebec, a town in Canada
Gracefield, New Zealand, a suburb of Lower Hutt City
 Gracefield Island, Nigeria

Other

Gracefield Arts Centre, a gallery in Dumfries, Scotland
Gracefield Branch, a section of railway line in Lower Hutt, New Zealand
Gracefield GAA, GAA Club representing the Offaly side of Portarlington

See also
 Grace Field, Australian football player